Gabriela-Eugenia Rotiș-Nagy (born 12 November 1980) is an Austrian-Romanian handballer who plays as a left back for Hypo Niederösterreich.

With Austria, she participated at the 2004 European Championship, the 2005 World Championship and the 2006 European Championship.

International honours
Champions League: 
Finalist: 2009
Cup Winners' Cup:  
Finalist: 2004
Champions Trophy: 
Finalist: 2004
Junior World Championship: 
Winner: 1999
Junior Handball Championship: 
Winner: 1998

References

1980 births
Living people
People from Sfântu Gheorghe
Austrian female handball players
Romanian female handball players
Expatriate handball players
Romanian expatriate sportspeople in Austria
Austrian expatriate sportspeople in Denmark
Romanian expatriate sportspeople in Denmark
Austrian expatriate sportspeople in Hungary
Romanian expatriate sportspeople in Hungary
Naturalised citizens of Austria
Austrian people of Romanian descent